Association football is the most popular sport, both in terms of participants and spectators, in Ljubljana.

History 
The first Slovenian football club, Hermes, was founded in Ljubljana in 1909. Two clubs based in Ljubljana – SK Ilirija and SK Slovan – participated in the 1920 Slovenian League as a founding members.

Clubs 
The table below lists all Ljubljana clubs.

Active

Defunct

Honours 
 Slovenian Champions (1991–present) (6)
 Olimpija (1945) (4)
 Olimpija (2005) (2)
 Ljubljana Subassociation League Champions (1920–1941) (16)
 Ilirija (12)
 Primorje (2)
 SK Ljubljana (2)
 Republic League Champions (1945–1991) (16)
 Železničar (5)
 Olimpija (1945) (4)
 Svoboda (4)
 Slovan (2)
 Garnizija JLA (1)
 Slovenian Football Cup (9)
 Olimpija (1945) (4)
 Olimpija (2005) (3)
 Interblock (2)
 Slovenian Supercup (2)
 Olimpija (1945) (1)
 Interblock (1)

 Slovenian Republic Football Cup (1953–1991) (16)
 Olimpija (1945) (13)
 Svoboda (2)
 Slovan (1)

Ljubljana derbies 
There were two major Ljubljana derbies. The first was between SK Ilirija and ASK Primorje, contested between 1920 and 1936, when both clubs merged. The second was between Olimpija and Železničar after the World War II. Both clubs were dissolved in 2005.

Stadiums 
 Bežigrad Stadium
 Ilirija Sports Park
 Kodeljevo Sports Park
 Šiška Sports Park
 Stožice Stadium

References

See also
Football in Slovenia

Football in Slovenia
Sport in Ljubljana